Burmantofts and Richmond Hill is a ward in the metropolitan borough of the City of Leeds, West Yorkshire, England.  It contains 15 listed buildings that are recorded in the National Heritage List for England.  Of these, one is listed at Grade I, the highest of the three grades, one is at Grade II*, the middle grade, and the others are at Grade II, the lowest grade.  The ward includes the areas of Burmantofts, Cross Green, and Richmond Hill.  The listed buildings consist of five churches and associated structures, a former school and an active school, a former mill, a former library and public baths, and two monuments in Beckett Street Cemetery.


Key

Buildings

References

Citations

Sources

 

Lists of listed buildings in West Yorkshire